Milind Naik is an Indian Politician from the state of Goa. He was a Member of the Goa Legislative Assembly representing the Mormugao constituency.

Ministry
He was a minister in the Laxmikant Parsekar led government in Goa.

Portfolios
 Urban Development
 Social Welfare
 Provedoria

Controversies 
Milind Naik was not in favour of a lockdown in July 2020, while Mormugaon town city council, local businesses, market committees as well as other BJP MLAs appealed for a voluntary lockdown.  It has been reported that allegedly, the lockdown has not been imposed in order to allow the transportation of coal and other minerals from Mormugao Port Trust.

References 

Members of the Goa Legislative Assembly
Living people
Bharatiya Janata Party politicians from Goa
People from Vasco da Gama, Goa
Goa MLAs 2017–2022
Year of birth missing (living people)